Sardostalita is a monotypic genus of European woodlouse hunting spiders containing the single species, Sardostalita patrizii. It was first described by F. Gasparo, who moved the sole species to its own genus when a male was discovered in 1999. It has only been found on Sardinia.

References

Dysderidae
Monotypic Araneomorphae genera